is a Japanese actor and martial artist. He is best known to international audiences for his roles as Genbu in Ninja in the Dragon's Den (1982), Ryuji Takayama in Ring (1998), Seibei Iguchi in The Twilight Samurai (2002), Ujio in The Last Samurai (2003), Kenji in Rush Hour 3 (2007), and Scorpion in Mortal Kombat (2021). His role as 'The Fool' in the Shakespeare play King Lear also gave him notable theatrical notice in the United Kingdom. In Japan, Sanada is also known for songs he recorded for movies he was in as well as songs he has performed for the public.

He made his first major Hollywood appearance portraying Ujio in The Last Samurai (2003), later appearing in such films as Sunshine (2007), Speed Racer (2008), The Wolverine, 47 Ronin (both 2013), Minions (2015), Life (2017), Avengers: Endgame (2019), Army of the Dead (2021), Bullet Train (2022), and John Wick: Chapter 4 (2023). He also had a recurring role on the HBO series Westworld (2018–2020).

Life and career

1966-1978: Child actor 
Born in Tokyo, he was scouted by an entertainer while playing with the son of the actor Kokichi Takada who lived in the same condominium, and after working as a model for a magazine for young children, he joined the Himawari Theatre Group at the age of five. He made his film debut in 1966 in the ninkyo yakuza film Game of Chance (浪曲子守唄) starring Shinichi "Sonny" Chiba, reprising his role as Chiba's character's son in two sequels released the following year.

Originally planning to be an action movie star, he studied Shorinji Kempo and later took up Kyokushin kaikan karate. He began playing baseball at age 8 as a catcher, and started training at the age of 11 with Chiba's Japan Action Club, where he developed good all-around martial arts ability and soon became Chiba's protégé. After entering high school, following Chiba's advice, he decided to devote himself to his studies and withdrew from performing arts activities. In 1978, he resumed his performing arts activities in earnest after passing the audition for the movie Shogun's Samurai (柳生一族の陰謀). It was at this point that he changed his surname from Shimozawa (下澤) to Sanada (真田).

1982-1999 :Hong Kong action films and Japanese character roles 
Sanada's martial arts film career introduced him to Hong Kong action cinema, portraying the ninja Genbu in Ninja in the Dragon's Den (1982), then working with Michelle Yeoh, with whom he co-starred in Royal Warriors (1986). He has a long-standing friendship with Jackie Chan. Outside of Japan, Sanada was often credited in his younger days as Henry Sanada, Harry Sanada, or Duke Sanada.

In Japan, Sanada established himself as a character actor in the 1984 movie Mahjong Hourouki directed by Makoto Wada.

1999-2002: Royal Shakespeare Company 
In 1999 and 2000, he performed with the Royal Shakespeare Company (RSC) in their production of King Lear, for which he was awarded as an Honorary Member of the Order of the British Empire (MBE) in 2002, citing his "contribution to spreading British culture in Japan through his performance in a joint Shakespeare production." Some media reports erroneously stated that Sanada received the honour for being the first Japanese actor to perform with the RSC, but Togo Igawa had joined the troupe much earlier, in 1986.

Sanada went on to perform roles in major films such as Tasogare Seibei (The Twilight Samurai), Ring and Kaitō Ruby.

2003-2009: The Last Samurai and international breakthrough 
In 2003, Sanada's role as Ujio, a master swordsman, opposite Tom Cruise, gained him international popularity and critical praise. Sanada played Matsuda (the Japanese imperialist who befriends Ralph Fiennes' character Todd Jackson) in the 2005 film The White Countess directed by James Ivory. He starred in the Chinese film The Promise directed by Chen Kaige as General Guangming. Sanada appeared in Rush Hour 3 in 2007 with Jackie Chan and Chris Tucker, Danny Boyle's Sunshine. and The City of Your Final Destination in 2009 in which he plays the younger lover of Anthony Hopkins' character Adam Gund.

2010-2019: Lost , Westworld, and Avengers: Endgame 
Sanada joined the cast of the ABC TV series Lost in 2010 during its sixth and final season. He portrayed Dogen, a high-ranking member of "The Others". In 2013, he appears in 47 Ronin (the first English-language adaptation of the Chushingura legend, Japan's most famous tale of samurai loyalty and revenge) alongside Keanu Reeves, and as Shingen Yashida in The Wolverine opposite Hugh Jackman.

Sanada was a guest star as Takehaya, a former Japanese Navy officer and legendary pirate captain in post-plague Asia, in the apocalyptic drama series The Last Ship. He also starred in the 2017 movie Life with Jake Gyllenhaal, Rebecca Ferguson, and Ryan Reynolds. In 2018, he began a recurring role as swordmaster Musashi on the HBO series Westworld and played the minor role of Akihiko in the 2019 film Avengers: Endgame. In August 2019, Sanada was cast in the Mortal Kombat reboot as Scorpion.

2021-present: Shogun, Bullet Train, John Wick: Chapter 4 
In 2021, Sanada was announced as part of the cast as well as a producer of the FX limited series Shogun, adapted from the James Clavell novel, playing the part of Lord Toranaga.

In 2022, Sanada had a major supporting role in Bullet Train opposite Brad Pitt, and in 2023, he portrayed Kojji Shimazu, manager of Osaka Continental Hotel, in John Wick: Chapter 4.

Education and music career 
Sanada received a Bachelor of Arts degree from Nihon University. 

From 1980 to 1991, Sanada released a series of albums and singles in Japan as a singer; several of these were tied to films, TV shows, or stage productions he was starring in. In 2010 and 2011, compilations were released covering his songs for movies and pop hits respectively.

Filmography

Films

Television

Theater

References

External links
 
 
https://www.discogs.com/artist/5373743-Hiroyuki-Sanada-2

1960 births
Living people
Male actors from Tokyo
Japanese male film actors
Japanese male karateka
Japanese male child actors
Kyokushin kaikan practitioners
Japanese male stage actors
Japanese male television actors
Honorary Members of the Order of the British Empire
Nihon University alumni
Royal Shakespeare Company members
Male Shakespearean actors
Taiga drama lead actors
Recipients of the Medal with Purple Ribbon
20th-century Japanese male actors
21st-century Japanese male actors